Karan is an Indian masculine given name which is given after Karna, one of the main protagonists of Hindu epic Mahabharata. It may refer to:
 Karan (actor), Indian film actor
 Karan Aujla, Indian-Punjabi singer and lyricist
 Karan Bajaj, Indian American author
 Karan Bhatia, American attorney
 Karanvir Bohra, Indian television actor, formerly known as Manoj Bohra
 Karan Brar, American actor
 Karan Grover, Indian television actor
 Karan Higdon (born 1996), American football player
 Karan Johar, an Indian film director and producer
 Karan Jotwani, Indian television actor
 Karan Kundra, Indian television actor
 Karan Malhotra, an Indian filmmaker
 Karan Mehra, Indian television actor
 Karan Patel, Indian television actor
 Karan Sharma (cricketer), Indian cricketer
 Karan Sharma (actor), Indian film actor
 Karan Sharma, Indian television actor
 Karan Singh, Indian politician
 Karan Singh Grover, Indian television actor
 Karan Tacker, Indian television actor
 Karan Thapar, Indian television commentator and interviewer
 Karan Vohra, Indian television actor
 Karan Wahi, Indian television actor

Karan is also an English-language feminine given name, a variant of Karen. It may also refer to:
 Karan Armstrong (1941–2021), American operatic soprano
 Karan Ashley, American actress
 Karan Casey, Irish singer
 Karan English, American politician
 Karan Shaner, Canadian judge

See also
Karan (surname)
Karen (name), given name and surname

References 

English-language feminine given names
Indian masculine given names